Józef Walczak (born 3 January 1931 – 14 April 2016) was a football player and manager who mainly played for ŁKS Łódź during his playing career, also making two international appearances for Poland between 1954–1956, and went on to manage 8 different teams.

Football
Walczak started his playing career with his local club ŁKS Łódź playing with ŁKS for two seasons, winning promotion in the first season before finishing second in the top division the season after. He moved to Zawisza Bydgoszcz for two seasons, finishing third with the team in his first season. He returned to ŁKS 1957, spending the next 9 years at the club. He played for ŁKS during their golden years helping them to their first I liga title in 1958, and won the Polish Cup with ŁKS in 1957, currently the only time the team have won the competition. In total for ŁKS Łódź, Walczak made a total of 211 games scoring 11 goals.

After his playing career Walczak went on to manage ŁKS Łódź, Włókniarz Łódź, Włókniarz Pabianice, Motor Lublin, Bałtyk Gdynia, Lechia Gdańsk, Stal Mielec and Cracovia. His management career saw him finishing second in the II liga with Lechia in 1978, while achieving a third-place finish in the top division with Stal Mielec in 1982.

Honours

Player
ŁKS Łódź
I liga
Winners (1): 1958
Runners-up (1): 1954
Third place (1): 1957
Polish Cup
Winners (1): 1957
II liga
Runners-up (1): 1953

Zawisza Bydgoszcz
II liga
Third place (1): 1955

Manager
Lechia Gdańsk
II liga
Runners-up (1): 1977-78

Stal Mielec
I liga
Third place (1): 1981-82

References

1931 births
2016 deaths
Footballers from Łódź
ŁKS Łódź players
ŁKS Łódź managers
Lechia Gdańsk managers
Polish footballers
Association football defenders
Poland international footballers
Polish football managers
Zawisza Bydgoszcz players
Stal Mielec managers
Motor Lublin managers
Bałtyk Gdynia managers
MKS Cracovia managers